Lindy's Sports, also known as Lindy's, is a sports magazine.  It was established in 1982, and is located in Birmingham, Alabama.

Lindy Davis is its publisher and founder, having started the magazine when he was a 26-year-old student at Samford University's Cumberland School of Law.  In 2003, Lyn Scarbrough was its marketing director.

It covers the National Football League, Major League Baseball, the National Basketball Association, college football, the National Collegiate Athletic Association (NCAA) sports, hockey, and fantasy sports.

References

External links
lindyssports.com

1982 establishments in Alabama
Sports magazines published in the United States
Magazines established in 1982
Magazines published in Alabama
Mass media in Birmingham, Alabama